WDOC (1310 AM) is a radio station  broadcasting a Southern Gospel format. It is licensed to Prestonsburg, Kentucky, United States. It is currently owned by Wdoc, Inc., and features programming from Premiere Radio Networks and Salem Communications.<ref>

References

External links

Southern Gospel radio stations in the United States
DOC
Prestonsburg, Kentucky